Coronach can refer to:
Coronach, a Highland dirge
Coronach, Saskatchewan
Coronach (horse), a thoroughbred racehorse